Zimbabwe is an African country, with adherents of Islam being a small minority. Due to the secular nature of Zimbabwe's constitution, Muslims are free to proselytize and build places of worship in the country. Islam is the religion of less than 1 percent of the population of Zimbabwe.

Demographics
Estimates on the number of Muslims in Zimbabwe are around 120,000. The Muslim community consists primarily of South Asian immigrants (Indian and Pakistani), a small but growing number of indigenous Zimbabweans, and migrants from other African countries such as the Yao tribe of neighbouring Malawi. There are mosques located in nearly all of the larger towns. As a result of outreach efforts in rural areas, some chiefs and headmen have reportedly converted from Christianity to Islam.

Remba (Lemba)

The Lemba or Remba are an ethnic group in Zimbabwe who have cultural traditions similar to Jews and Muslims in the Middle East, such as male circumcision.

Famous Zimbabwean Muslims
Mufti Menk is the Grand Mufti of Zimbabwe, and was born on June 27, 1975. Mufti Menk has many social media websites and such, including YouTube.

See also
Religion in Zimbabwe
Ismail ibn Musa Menk, the Grand Mufti of Zimbabwe

References

Further reading

External links 

 Reporter Interactive at Archive.org: Zimbabwean Christians and Muslims
 New York Times: the ban of Calls to Prayer in Zimbabwe
 US State department: religion in Zimbabwe

Zimbabwe
Religion in Zimbabwe
Zimbabwe